Expedition of Ghalib ibn Abdullah al-Laithi to Fadak took place in January 629 AD, 10th Month 7AH, of the Islamic Calendar.

Expedition
Many of Muhammad's followers were killed in the Expedition of Bashir Ibn Sa’d al-Ansari (Fadak), so Muhammad sent Ghalib ibn Abdullah al-Laithi to avenge the death of his comrades. Muhammad said to Ghalib according to Ibn Sa'd:

Go to the place where the companions of Bashir Ibn Sa'd were killed
[Ibn Sa'd, Kitab al-tabaqat al-kabir, Volume 2, Pg 156]

Muhammad also said to al-Zubayr, another leader of this 200 man team:

“If Allah makes you victorious do not show leniency to them.”
[Ibn Sa'd, Kitab al-tabaqat al-kabir, Volume 2, Pg 156]
 The life of Mahomet and history of Islam, Volume 4, By Sir William Muir, Pg 94 Muir translates Ibn Sa'd as "If the lord deliver thy into your hands, let not a soul escape" instead of "If Allah makes you victorious, do not show them leniency"

Ghalib bin ‘Abdullah at the head of 200 men was despatched to Fadak, and they successfully avenged there comrades. They killed all the rebels who fell into the hands of the Muslim force, and a captured a lot of booty (i.e. the camels were captured, which they drove back to Medina).

See also
Military career of Muhammad
List of expeditions of Muhammad

Notes

628
Campaigns ordered by Muhammad